Caffè macchiato, sometimes called espresso macchiato, is an espresso coffee drink with a small amount of milk, usually foamed. In Italian, macchiato means "stained" or "spotted", so the literal translation of caffè macchiato is "stained coffee" or "marked coffee".

History
The origin of the name "macchiato" stems from baristas needing to show the serving waiters the difference between an espresso and an espresso with a tiny bit of milk in it; the latter was "marked". The idea is reflected in the Portuguese name for the drink: , meaning coffee with a drop.

Preparation

The caffè macchiato has the highest ratio of espresso to milk of any drink made with those ingredients. The intent is that the milk moderates, rather than overwhelms, the taste of the coffee while adding a touch of sweetness. The drink is typically prepared by pouring a small amount of steamed milk directly into a single shot of espresso.

Photos

See also

Latte macchiato
List of coffee drinks
Steamer (or "babycino") – steamed milk only

References

Sources

Coffee drinks
Italian drinks
Coffee in Italy